Arthur Michael Shepley-Smith (29 September 1907 – 28 September 1961), known professionally as Michael Shepley, was a British actor, appearing in theatre, film and some television between 1929 and 1961.

He was born in Plymouth, Devon. Shepley made his screen début in the 1931 Twickenham Studios film Black Coffee. He went on to appear in more than sixty films, the last of which was Don't Bother to Knock in 1961, the year of his death.

Filmography

 Black Coffee (1931) - Raynor
 A Shot in the Dark (1933) - Vivien Waugh
 Bella Donna (1934) - Dr, Baring-Hartley
 Tangled Evidence (1934) - Gilbert Morfield
 Lord Edgware Dies (1934) - Captain Roland Marsh
 Are You a Mason? (1934) - Ernest Monison
 The Green Pack (1934) - Mark Elliott
 Open All Night (1934) - Hilary
 The Rocks of Valpre (1935) - Trevor Mordaunt
 Lazybones (1935) - Hildebrand Pope
 The Triumph of Sherlock Holmes (1935) - Cecil Barker
 The Lad (1935) - Arthur Maddeley
 That's My Uncle (1935) - Charlie Cookson
 Squibs (1935) - Colin Barratt
 Vintage Wine (1935) - Richard Emsley
 Jubilee Window (1935) - Dacres
 The Ace of Spades (1935) - George Despard
 The Private Secretary (1935) - Henry Marsland
 In the Soup (1936) - Paul Hemming
 Dishonour Bright (1936) - Spooner (uncredited)
 Beauty and the Barge (1937) - Hebert Manners
 Housemaster (1938) - Victor Beamish
 It's in the Air (1938) - Adjutant
 Crackerjack (1938) - Wally Astill (uncredited)
 Goodbye, Mr. Chips (1939) - Teacher (uncredited)
 Contraband (1940) - Man in Club (uncredited)
 Quiet Wedding (1941) - Marcia's Husband
 The Great Mr. Handel (1942) - Sir Charles Marsham
 Women Aren't Angels (1943) - Misunderstood gent (uncredited)
 The Demi-Paradise (1943) - Mr. Walford
 Henry V (1944) - Captain Gower - Captain in the English Army
 I Live in Grosvenor Square (1945) - Lt. Lutyens
 A Place of One's Own (1945) - Maj. Manning Tutthorn
 The Life and Adventures of Nicholas Nickleby (1947) - Mr. Gregsbury M.P.
 Mine Own Executioner (1947) - Peter Edge
 Elizabeth of Ladymead (1948) - Major Wrigley (1903)
 Maytime in Mayfair (1949) - Shepherd
 Mr. Denning Drives North (1952) - Chairman of Court
 Secret People (1952) - Manager of the British Pavilion
 Home at Seven (1952) - Major Watson
 You Know What Sailors Are (1954) - Admiral
 Trouble in the Glen (1954) - Man (uncredited)
 Happy Ever After (1954) - Major McGlusky
 Where There's a Will (1955) - Mr. Cogent
 Doctor at Sea (1955) - Jill's father
 An Alligator Named Daisy (1955) - The judge
 My Teenage Daughter (1956) - Sir Henry
 Dry Rot (1956) - Col. Wagstaff
 The Passionate Stranger (1957) - Miles Easter
 Not Wanted on Voyage (1957) - Col. Blewton-Fawcett
 Dunkirk (1958) - Bit Role (uncredited)
 Gideon's Day (1958) - Sir Rupert
 Upgreen - And at 'Em (1960)
 Just Joe (1960) - Fowler
 Double Bunk (1961) - Granville-Carter
 Don't Bother to Knock (1961) - Colonel (final film role)

Cricket
Shepley was an opening batsman, playing for Westminster from 1923 to 1926, as captain in 1926. In 1925 his batting average was at 33.11, the highest of the team, scoring 88 against Malvern. He played in the Oxford Freshmen's match in 1927.

References

External links
 

1907 births
1961 deaths
20th-century English male actors
English male film actors
English male stage actors
English male television actors
Male actors from Plymouth, Devon